Les Nanas (The Chicks) is a 1985 French comedy with an entirely female cast, directed by Annick Lanoë.

Plot
Christine is in her forties when she learns that her partner Robert has been having an affair for the past few months.  As a liberated woman, Christine refuses to put up with this situation, and supported by her girlfriends who are themselves struggling to find their Mr Right, she takes steps to get in touch with her rival...

Cast
 Marie-France Pisier as Christine 
 Dominique Lavanant as Evelyne 
 Macha Méril as Françoise 
 Anémone as Odile
 Odette Laure as Christine 's mother
 Catherine Samie as Simone 
 Juliette Binoche as Antoinette 
 Clémentine Célarié as Éliane 
 Marilú Marini as Mariana 
 Caroline Loeb as Adèle
 Eva Ionesco as Miss France

Catherine Jacob appeared in an uncredited role.

References

External links

 
 
 

1985 films
1985 comedy films
1980s female buddy films
French comedy films
1980s French-language films
Miss France in fiction
Films about beauty queens
1980s French films